James of Scotland may refer to:

 James I of Scotland (1394–1437), King of Scots
 James II of Scotland (1430–1460), King of Scots
 James III of Scotland (c. 1451–1488), King of Scots
 James IV of Scotland (1473–1513), King of Scots
 James V of Scotland (1512–1542), King of Scots
 James VI of Scotland (1566–1625), King of Scots
 James VII of Scotland (1685–1688), King of Scots

See also
 James Stewart, 5th High Steward of Scotland (1243–1309), Guardian of Scotland